Tiger was an Indian detective soap opera that aired in the 1990s, directed by Shahab Shamsi.

Plot
Set in Mumbai, Maharashtra, India, it consists of unique episodes of detective theme.

Crew
Director: Shahab Shamsi

Cast

See also
 Junoon
 Ajnabi

References

DD Metro original programming
Indian television soap operas
1990s Indian television series